Steve Williams (born 20 October 1971) is a Welsh musician, keyboardist and main songwriter for British power metal band Power Quest and former member of DragonForce.

Williams formed Power Quest in 2001 after leaving DragonForce (known at the time as DragonHeart) and has been their main songwriter and face of the band since then. In 2008 he accepted an offer from former Manowar guitarist David Shankle to join D.S.G., but left only a few months later.

He announced the split-up of Power Quest in January 2013, citing financial issues and lack of label support.

In July 2013, it was revealed that Steve Williams was the new keyboard player for the multi-national melodic metal band Eden's Curse replacing former keyboardist Alessandro Del Vecchio.

In April 2016 Steve Williams announced that Power Quest is becoming active again after three years break.

Discography
DragonForce:
 Valley of the Damned demo (2000)

Power Quest studio albums:
 Wings of Forever (2002)
 Neverworld (2003)
 Magic Never Dies (2005)
 Master of Illusion (2008)
 Blood Alliance (2011)
 Sixth Dimension (2017)

Eden's Curse Studio albums:
 Symphony of Sin (2013)

References

External links
Power Quest Official Website

English heavy metal keyboardists
1971 births
Living people